Vickida No Varghodo is a 2022 Indian Gujarati comedy film directed by Rahul Bhole and Vinit Kanojia. The film stars Malhar Thakar, Monal Gajjar, Manasi Rachh and Jinal Belani in lead roles. The film is produced by Sharad Patel, Shreyanshi Patel, Vikas Agarwal, Pankaj Keshruwala. The film was released on 8 July 2022. It is a Super Hit Gujarati Film of 2022 As Loved By The Family Audience with a run time of more than 50 days in the theatres.Movie Earn More Than 15cr

Plot
Vicky's love life and how his love affairs start, progress and ends tragically . That's not all, the chaos breaks out when he faces a blast from the past and his present goes for a toss. This leaves him, the girls and his father at a cliff hanger followed by comedy of errors.

Cast 

 Malhar Thakar as Vicky
 Monal Gajjar as Anushree
 Manasi Rachh as Vidya
 Jhinal Belani as Radhika
 Alapana Buch as Vicky's Mother
 Anurag Prapanna as Vicky's Father
 Bhaumik Ahir as Satish
 Chetan Daiya as Arvind Singh
 Sonali Lele Desai as Saroj
 Chirayu Mistry as Paresh
 Manan Desai as Jamaican Singer

Soundtrack
"Udi Re" was sung by Sonu Nigam.

Marketing and release
The trailer garnered 5 million views within 24 hours of its release. The film was initially projected to be released in mid-2020. The film was released on 8 July 2022.

Reception 
Rachana Joshi of Mid-day rated the film as 2.5 out of 5. She praised the performances and songs but criticised the length.

References

External links 
 

2022 comedy-drama films
2020s Gujarati-language films
Films shot in Gujarat
Indian comedy-drama films